The Lucky Guy (行運一條龍) is a 1998 Hong Kong comedy film directed by Lee Lik-Chi (李力持) and starring Stephen Chow, Sammi Cheng (鄭秀文), Daniel Chan (陳曉東) and Shu Qi.

Synopsis
"Lucky" Coffee Shop, a Cha Chaan Teng, is well known for its egg tarts and tea. Waiter Sui, named as Prince Egg Tart, attracts many girls but only loves Candy. He and his friends, Nam, and Fok, all have love problems. At the same time, the coffee shop may collapse since the landlord is increasing the rent tremendously. Let's see how the lucky guys of the shop can revert this situation...

Cast and roles

 Stephen Chow - Ho Kam Sui (Prince Egg-Tart)
 Ng Man-tat (吳孟達) - Mr. Li
 Eric Kot (葛民輝) - Fook
 Daniel Chan - Ah Nam (Shin Chan)		
 Sammi Cheng - Candy Yip Yuk Fun
 Kristy Yang - Fanny
 Shu Qi - Fon Fon
 Vincent Kok
 Sandra Ng	
 Lee Kin-yan		
 Lee Siu-kei		
 Tin Kai Man		
 Wong Jing		
 Wong Yut Fei		
 Joyce Chan

External links

1990s Cantonese-language films
1998 films
1998 romantic comedy films
Films directed by Lee Lik-chi
Hong Kong romantic comedy films
1990s Hong Kong films